Akramabad (also Romanized as Akramābād; also known as Karīm Ābād and Ūrlūlī) is a village in Kolah Boz-e Sharqi Rural District, in the Central District of Meyaneh County, East Azerbaijan Province, Iran. At the 2006 census, its population was 334, in 58 families.

References 

Populated places in Meyaneh County